The Capital Region Independent Schools Association (Crisa) includes 18 private, independent schools in the region of New York State.

 Academy of the Holy Names, Albany (Girls, Day, K-12, Roman Catholic)
 The Albany Academy, Albany (Boys, Day, K-12)
 Albany Academy for Girls, Albany (Girls, Day, K-12) 
 Augustine Classical Academy, Mechanicville (Coed, Day, K-12, Classical & Christian)
 Bet Shraga Hebrew Academy of the Capital District, Albany (Coed, Day, K-8, Jewish)
 Bethlehem Children's School, Slingerlands (Coed, Day, K-8)
 Brown School, Schenectady (Coed, Day, PreK-9) 
 Christian Brothers Academy, Colonie (Boys, Day, 6–12, Roman Catholic) 
 Darrow School, New Lebanon (Coed, Boarding/Day, 9–12)
 Doane Stuart School, Rensselaer (Coed, Day, K-12)
 Emma Willard School, Troy (Girls, Boarding/Day, 9–12)
 Hoosac School, Hoosick, (Coed, Boarding/Day, 8–12, Episcopal)
 Loudonville Christian School, Loudonville (Coed, Day, PreK-12, Evangelical Christian) 
 Montessori School of Albany, Rensselaer (Coed, Day, K-8) 
 Our Savior's Lutheran School, Colonie (Coed, Day, PreK-8, Lutheran) 
 Robert C. Parker School, Wynantskill (Coed, Day, K-8)
 St. Gregory's School for Boys, Loudonville (Boys, Day, K-8, Roman Catholic)
 Saratoga Independent School, Saratoga Springs (Coed, Day, K-8)
 Susan O'Dell Taylor School for Children, Troy (Coed, Day, K-5)
 Waldorf School of Saratoga Springs, Saratoga Springs (Coed, Day, K-12)
 Woodland Hill Montessori School, North Greenbush (Coed, Day, PreK-8)

External links
 Capital Region Independent Schools Association website

United States schools associations
Capital District (New York)
Education in New York (state)